Daphoenus is an extinct genus of bear dogs.

Species

D. hartshornianus fossils found in Oligocene Orellan rocks in the Lower Nodular Zone, Pennington County, South Dakota are dated at ~33.4 Ma. Other sites include the Prairie Dog Creek Site and Warbonnet Creek Site, Sioux County, Nebraska ~33.4 Ma., Bartlett High Site, Dawes County, Nebraska ~33.2 Ma., Babby Butte Site, Oglala Lakota County, South Dakota ~33.4 Ma—33.2 Ma.

D. lambei fossils found in Eocene Duchesnean rocks at the Big Red Horizon Site, Presidio County, Texas are dated at ~38.4—38.3 Ma. Other sites include the Badwater Locality 20 Site and Wood Locality Site, Natrona County, Wyoming ~41.8 Ma., Lac Pelletier Lower Fauna Site, Saskatchewan ~42.3 Ma.

D. ruber fossils were found in Oligocene Arikareean rocks in the Tecuya Canyon Formation of Kern County, California with other mammal species and are dated at ~29.8—24.8 Ma.

D. socialis fossils found in Oligocene Arikareean rocks at the Haystack Member, Wheeler County, Oregon are dated at ~24.3 Ma. and Kimberly Member, Grant County, Oregon with several other species of mammal such as Hesperocyon, Hypertragulus, and Leptomeryx dating ~25.4—25.3 Ma.

Description
 
Daphoenus, like the rest of its family, was called a "bear dog" because it had characteristics of both bears and dogs. These animals were about the size of the present day coyote. Daphoenus vetus was the largest species. Daphoenus had short legs, and could only make quick sprints; it was not capable of running long distances. It is thought that these animals ambushed their prey, and did some scavenging. Fossil footprints suggested that, like present-day bears, these animals walked in a flat-footed way. Daphoenus dug burrows for their offspring to stay in and hide from their prey.

Distribution
 
Daphoenus fossils found in late Oligocene rocks in the Great Plains are dated at ~28 Ma. Daphoenus survived to 27 Ma in the Pacific Northwest in the John Day beds of Oregon. Other sites include: Alachua County, Florida (Whitneyan) estimated at 31.1—24.3 Ma., Tecuya Canyon, California (Arikareean age) 30.8—20.6 Ma., Haystack Member Formation, Wheeler County, Oregon (Hemingfordian) 20.6—16.3 Ma., Lac Pelletier, Alberta, Canada (Duchesnean) ~42 Ma.

References

Bear dogs
Oligocene caniforms
Burdigalian extinctions
Cenozoic mammals of North America
White River Fauna
Miocene carnivorans
Eocene genus first appearances
Fossil taxa described in 1853
Prehistoric carnivoran genera